The Catholic Diocese of Caroline Islands is an ecclesiastical territory or diocese of the Catholic Church in the Federated States of Micronesia and in the Republic of Palau. It is a suffragan diocese of the Ecclesiastical Province of Agaña. The Diocese of Caroline Islands is led by a bishop who pastors the mother church, the Cathedral of the Immaculate Heart of Mary.

History 
The diocese was established on 19 December 1905, as the Apostolic Prefecture (missionary jurisdiction) of Caroline Islands, uniting the Mission sui iuris of Eastern Carolines and Mission sui iuris of Western Carolines, both of which had been split from the Apostolic Prefecture of Micronesia in 1886.

It became the Apostolic Vicariate (higher missionary stage jurisdiction, entitled to a titular bishop) of Marianne and Caroline Islands on 1 March 1911. It grew to become the Apostolic Vicariate of Marianne, Caroline and Marshall Islands on 4 May 1923. It changed its name to become the Apostolic Vicariate of Caroline and Marshall Islands on 4 July 1946.

It was elevated to become the diocese Carolines-Marshalls by promotion on 3 May 1979. 
 
The diocese was split on 23 April 1993 by Pope John Paul II, resulting in the creation of the present-day Diocese of Caroline Islands and the Apostolic Prefecture of the Marshall Islands.

Bishops

Ordinaries
Salvador-Pierre Walleser (1912 – 1919)
Vacant (1920 – 1922)
Santiago López de Rego y Labarta S.J. (1923 –b1938)
Vacant (1939 – 1951)
Thomas John Feeney S.J. (1951 - 1955)
Vincent Ignatius Kennally S.J. (1956 – 1971)
Martin Joseph Neylon S.J. (1971 – 1995)
 coadjutor 1969 – 1971
Amando Samo (1995 – 2020)
 auxiliary 1987 – 1994
 coadjutor 1994 – 1995
Julio Angkel (2020 – present)
 coadjutor 2017 – 2020

References

External links 
Catholic Hierarchy Profile of the Diocese of Caroline Islands

Catholic Church in the Federated States of Micronesia
Catholic Church in Palau
Caroline Islands
Christian organizations established in 1905
Caroline Islands
1905 establishments in the German colonial empire